Eugene Edward Siler Jr. (born October 19, 1936) is a Senior United States circuit judge of the United States Court of Appeals for the Sixth Circuit and a former United States District Judge of the United States District Court for the Eastern District of Kentucky and the United States District Court for the Western District of Kentucky.

Education and career

Born in Williamsburg, Kentucky, Siler is the son of  Lowell Jones and later Congressman Eugene Siler. Siler received a Bachelor of Arts degree from Vanderbilt University in 1958, a Bachelor of Laws from the University of Virginia School of Law in 1963, and a Master of Laws from Georgetown University Law Center in 1964. He was in the United States Navy Midshipman in 1957. He was a United States Naval Reserve Lieutenant from 1958 to 1983. He was in private practice in Williamsburg from 1964 to 1970. He was a county attorney of Whitley County, Kentucky from 1965 to 1970. He was the United States Attorney for the Eastern District of Kentucky from 1970 to 1975.

Federal judicial service

Siler was nominated by President Gerald Ford on September 19, 1975, to a joint seat on the United States District Court for the Eastern District of Kentucky and the United States District Court for the Western District of Kentucky vacated by Judge Mac Swinford. He was confirmed by the United States Senate on November 11, 1975, and received his commission on November 13, 1975. He served as Chief Judge of the Eastern District from 1984 to 1991. Siler service terminated on both courts on September 20, 1991, due to elevation to the Sixth Circuit.

Siler was nominated by President George H. W. Bush on June 19, 1991, to a seat on the United States Court of Appeals for the Sixth Circuit vacated by Judge Harry Walker Wellford. He was confirmed by the United States Senate on September 12, 1991, and received his commission on September 16, 1991. He assumed senior status on December 31, 2001.

See also
 List of United States federal judges by longevity of service

References

Sources

1936 births
20th-century American judges
Georgetown University Law Center alumni
Judges of the United States Court of Appeals for the Sixth Circuit
Judges of the United States District Court for the Eastern District of Kentucky
Judges of the United States District Court for the Western District of Kentucky
Kentucky Republicans
Living people
People from Whitley County, Kentucky
United States Attorneys for the Eastern District of Kentucky
United States court of appeals judges appointed by George H. W. Bush
United States district court judges appointed by Gerald Ford
United States Navy officers
University of Virginia School of Law alumni
Vanderbilt University alumni
United States Navy reservists